Trismelasmos euphanes is a moth in the family Cossidae. It is found in New Guinea and the Philippines.

References

Zeuzerinae
Moths described in 1932